R L Clark (November 21, 1930 – June 8, 2020) was an American politician.

Clark was born in Spring Creek, North Carolina in Madison County, North Carolina and graduated from Spring Creek High School. He received his bachelor's and master's degrees from Western Carolina University. Clark lived in Asheville, North Carolina and was a businessman. Clark served in the North Carolina Senate from 1995 to 1998 and was a Republican. Clark died in Asheville, North Carolina.

Notes

1930 births
2020 deaths
Politicians from Asheville, North Carolina
People from Madison County, North Carolina
Businesspeople from North Carolina
Western Carolina University alumni
Republican Party North Carolina state senators